Kalagala is a town in Central Uganda. It is one of the metropolitan areas in Luweero District. Other towns in the district include: Bamunanika, Bombo, Luweero, Wobulenzi and Ziroobwe.

Location
The coordinates of the town are:00 36 47N, 32 36 56E (Latitude:0.6130; Longitude:32.6105).

Population
The exact population of Kalagala is not known, as of November 2010.

Landmarks
The landmarks within the town limits or close to the edges of town include:

 The offices of Kalagala Town Council
 The offices of Kalagala sub-county
 Kalagala Central Market
 The Main Campus of Bugema University - Located in Kalagala sub-county on Gayaza-Ziroobwe Road.
 The Fisher Branch Kalagala High School - A mixed, residential, private high school with enrollment of over 40
0 students.

See also
Luweero District
Luweero Triangle
Central Region, Uganda

References

External links
 Luweero District Information Portal

Populated places in Central Region, Uganda
Cities in the Great Rift Valley
Luweero District